Alfred Page Lane (September 26, 1891 – October 2, 1965) was an American sport shooter who competed at the 1912 and 1920 Summer Olympics. He is a five-time Olympic champion, and is the first of five shooters to have won two Olympic individual gold medals.

Biography
Lane was born to Frederic Henry Lane and Louise Abbott Mosely. He started training in shooting at the Manhattan Rifle and Revolver Association in New York, and by the age of 19 won several U.S. Revolver Association (USRA) championships. After the 1912 Olympics, he held USRA Champion titles for three consecutive years. He was later employed by Remington Arms for their advertising campaigns, and then became head of the photographic department for a magazine publisher.

His five gold medals and one bronze medal were on loan from his family and on display at the NRA's National Firearms Museum in Fairfax, Virginia. He was inducted into the United States International Shooters Hall of Fame in 1991.

See also
List of multiple Olympic gold medalists

References

1891 births
1965 deaths
American male sport shooters
United States Distinguished Marksman
Shooters at the 1912 Summer Olympics
Shooters at the 1920 Summer Olympics
Olympic gold medalists for the United States in shooting
Olympic bronze medalists for the United States in shooting
Medalists at the 1912 Summer Olympics
Medalists at the 1920 Summer Olympics